Tiree Airport  is located  north northeast of Balemartine on the island of Tiree in the Inner Hebrides off the west coast of Scotland. It is owned and maintained by Highlands and Islands Airports Limited.

The airport is served by a scheduled service from Glasgow, operated by a Loganair Twin Otter.

History

The airfield is the former Royal Air Force Tiree which was requisitioned in 1940 and became operational in April 1942 before being transferred to Ministry of Civil Aviation in 1947.

The following units were based at RAF Tiree at some point:
 No. 224 Squadron RAF
 No. 281 Squadron RAF
 No. 304 Polish Bomber Squadron
 No. 518 Squadron RAF
 819 Naval Air Squadron
 845 Naval Air Squadron
 1840 Naval Air Squadron
 No. 2842 Squadron RAF Regiment
 Meteorological Conversion Unit RAF (October 1943 - February 1944)

Airlines and destinations

Statistics

References

Citations

Bibliography

External links

Airports in Scotland
Transport in Argyll and Bute
Buildings and structures in Argyll and Bute
Highlands and Islands Airports
Tiree
Airports established in 1942
1942 establishments in Scotland